The 2012–13 figure skating season began on July 1, 2012, and ended on June 30, 2013. During this season, elite skaters from men's singles, ladies' singles, pair skating, and ice dance competed on the International Skating Union (ISU) Championship level at the 2013 European, Four Continents, World Junior, and World Championships. They also competed in elite events such as the Grand Prix series and Junior Grand Prix series, culminating in the Grand Prix Final.

Season notes 
The 2012–2013 pattern dance in the short dance was the Yankee Polka on the senior level and Blues on the junior level.

One accident occurred at a competition – at the 2012 Cup of China, the United States' Adam Rippon collided with China's Song Nan who sustained a concussion and withdrew.

Age eligibility 
Skaters competing on the junior level were required to be at least 13 but not 19 – or 21 for male pair skaters and ice dancers – before July 1, 2012. Those who turned 14 before that date were eligible for the senior Grand Prix series and senior B internationals. Those who turned 15 before July 1, 2012 were also eligible for the senior World, European, and Four Continents Championships.

Minimum scores

Grand Prix 
In order to compete in the Grand Prix series, skaters were required to reach the minimum total score at an accepted ISU event:

ISU Championships 
In June 2012, the International Skating Union increased the minimum technical scores for ISU Championships, reserving the right to revise the scores if they resulted in too few or too many entries. The decision followed a vote to eliminate the preliminary (qualifying) round. Midway through the season, the ISU confirmed the season's minimums for the European, Four Continents and World Junior Championships, but lowered the singles and pairs minimums for the senior World Championships.

To be eligible to compete at the European, Four Continents, Junior World, or World Championships, skaters were required to achieve the following scores in a prior ISU-recognized event.

Music

Partnership changes 
Some skaters announced the dissolution of a partnership or formation of a new one. Listed are changes involving at least one partner who competed at Worlds, Europeans, Four Continents, Junior Worlds or the senior Grand Prix, or who medaled on the Junior Grand Prix circuit.

Coaching changes

Retirements

Competitions 
National skating associations may have held pre-season camps for members of their national team, during which skaters presented their programs and received feedback in preparation for the season. U.S. Figure Skating held its annual Champs Camp in August, while the Russian Skating Federation had test skates in August and September. In 2013, the ISU introduced the World Development Trophy for developing skating nations.

The 2012–2013 season included the following competitions.

Key

International medalists

Men

Ladies

Pairs

Ice dance

Season's best scores

Men

Ladies

Pairs

Ice dance

Standings and ranking

Season-end standings (top 30)

Men's singles

Ladies' singles

Pairs

Ice dance

Season's ranking (top 30)

Men's singles

Ladies' singles

Pairs

Ice dance

References

External links 
 International Skating Union

Seasons in figure skating
2012 in figure skating
2013 in figure skating